Sira is a UK-based notified body, specialising in ATEX, IECEX and North American product approvals.

Foundation 
Sira began life as the British Scientific Instrument Research Association (BSIRA). It was founded in 1918 by a Committee of the Privy Council for the promotion of scientific and industrial research and supported by the DSIR. The first members of the association were representatives of the optical industry, but these were joined in the same year by the electrical scientific instrument, electromedical, and X-ray industries. Its first director of research was Sir Herbert Jackson (1863–1936).

BSIRA's London headquarters were destroyed in the Second World War and, in 1947, the association moved to a site in South Hill, Chislehurst, a Grade II Listed former private house called 'Sitka' By the 1960s, the association had become better-known as 'Sira',. It evolved into a group of British engineering companies, based in south London, that designed test equipment and provided calibration services.

Fate 
In 2006, Sira Test and Certification Ltd, Sira Defence and Security, and Sira Environmental were owned by Volveré plc. In July 2009, Volvere sold Sira Test and Certification Ltd, Sira Certification Service and Sira Environmental Ltd to CSA International.

Similar organizations 
 Baseefa — a similar organization in the UK
 Canadian Standards Association a similar organization in Canada; also serves as a competitive alternative for USA products
 ETL SEMKO — a competing testing laboratory, part of Intertek; based in London, UK
 IAPMO R&T — certification body based in Ontario, California, USA
 MET Laboratories, Inc. — testing laboratory based in Baltimore, Maryland, USA
 NTA Inc — certification agency based in Nappanee, Indiana, USA
 NCC — a similar Brazilian approvals organisation
 TÜV — a similar German approvals organisation
 Underwriters Laboratories — testing organization, based in Northbrook, Illinois, USA
 TRaC Global — a test laboratory and certification body based in the UK

See also 
 ANSI
 Consumers Union
 Good Housekeeping Seal
 NEMKO
 Product certification
 Quality control
 RoHS
 Safety engineering

References

External links 
 Sira Certification
 Sira Consulting Ltd
 Sira Defence and Security
 Sira Defence and Security
 CSA International

British research associations
Companies based in Cheshire
Engineering companies of the United Kingdom
1918 establishments in the United Kingdom
Organizations established in 1918
Product-testing organizations
Research institutes in Cheshire
Runcorn
Scientific instruments